|}

The St. Simon Stakes is a Group 3 flat horse race in Great Britain open to thoroughbreds aged three years or older. It is run at Newbury over a distance of 1 mile and 4 furlongs (2,414 metres), and it is scheduled to take place each year in October.

History
The event is named after St. Simon, an undefeated racehorse in the 1880s and subsequently a successful sire. It was established in 1969, and the first running was won by Rangong.

The present system of race grading was introduced in 1971, and the St. Simon Stakes was initially given Group 2 status. By the end of the decade it was classed at Group 3 level. 
The St. Simon Stakes is part of Newbury's last flat racing fixture of the year. The race is currently run under the sponsored title of the Pravha Stakes.

Records
Most successful horse (2 wins):
 Jupiter Island – 1983, 1986

Leading jockey (3 wins):
 Brian Taylor – Frascati (1971), Ballyhot (1973), Obraztsovy (1978)
 Pat Eddery – Main Reef (1979), Dark Moondancer (1998), Signorina Cattiva (1999)
 Michael Hills – Further Flight (1991), Persian Brave (1994), High Heeled (2009)

Leading trainer (4 wins):
 Henry Cecil – Main Reef (1979), Upend (1988), Wellbeing (2000), High Pitched (2001)

Winners

See also
 Horse racing in Great Britain
 List of British flat horse races

References

 Paris-Turf: 

 Racing Post:

 galopp-sieger.de – St. Simon Stakes.
 horseracingintfed.com – International Federation of Horseracing Authorities – St. Simon Stakes (2018).
 pedigreequery.com – St. Simon Stakes – Newbury.
 

Flat races in Great Britain
Newbury Racecourse
Open middle distance horse races
Recurring sporting events established in 1969
1969 establishments in England